A smart refrigerator, also known as internet refrigerator, refrigerator or in Azia known as a QRfridge refrigerator which is able to communicate with the internet.  This kind of refrigerator is often equipped to determine itself whenever a food item needs to be replenished. This still partly done by the human factor the next evolution of smart is the Intelligent Refrigerator adding infantry tracking on all the items inside the fridge and payment flow to the mix like connecting it to an online retail store to always have a full fridge at home for domestic use and for Commercial use payment terminal and lock are added for thinks like unmade retail and queue busting.

History
By the late 1990s and the early 2000s, the idea of connecting home appliances to the internet (Internet of Things) had been popularized and was seen as the next big thing.  In June 2000, LG launched the world's first internet refrigerator, the Internet Digital DIOS.  This refrigerator was an unsuccessful product because the consumers had seen it as unnecessary and expensive (more than $20,000).

After the 2000s Companys like Samsung added touch displays on to the domestic refrigerator units and cameras inside the fridge the Samsung Family Hub™ series, making it possible to see the inside fridge. An early form of inventory tracking this inventory tracking is used in commercial vending machines or when refrigeration talks about intelligent fridges when knowing the amount in vending machines or refrigeration units, Technology used to track the items inside are:

Counting items 
1. Vision (Cameras min of 2 or per shelf  )   
2. Weight (into the shelf and combination whit vision )   
3. Distance ( IR, Radar, Lidar, Sound)   
4. RFID ( HF , UHF  , BLE ) 

5. Barcode scanning EAN (1D), QR (2d) this system is a so-called trust system and is not really intelligent due to the Human factor.  

The intelligent part(s) is a combination of the Smart refrigerator (IoT) the inventory tracking and payments options of this so-called automatic check-out or unmanned store and 
The use flows for payments are

Payment & user ID 
1. Mobile app ( scanning QR code, NFC, BLE )
2. Bank card ( payment terminal )
3. Cash ( coin box like traditional vending machines ) 
4. RFID ( NFC, RFID tag )

Lock 
Also, the difference between smart vs intelligent is to give physical access to products in side refrigerators/vending machines by having an  electric lock that can be controlled. Or gates when talking about retail stores like Amazon go  where the user is tracked by cameras when entering and exiting the store. The Smart refrigerator  can control the lock by app / API or RFID label or bags, the general use for an  electric lock connected with smart IOT parts is for the food-safe item(s) to close the door when products went bad so the products can not be consumed by mistake, Mostly used when having a so-called “intelligent” system build on top of this. Traditionally the lock on the refrigerator is mechanelkly has a lock at the door and kickplate and a key setup.

Environment sensors 
The most basic part of any fridge is the so-called door sensor this input sensor is connected to the eveapetor fan or/and count-down timer to let the user know the door is opened too long by audio single. And simple fridge lights ( ON / OFF )
Also, there are mostly one or multiple temperature sensors for normal refrigerator units where the smart part is gathering this data, And on of offsite working on the data and logic control also additional is RGB led control and full touch displays where this is part of  “intelligent to show user price/discounts

Intelligent refrigerator 
The term “intelligent” refrigerator/fridge/freezer/cabinet in 2018 is used to describe the use of unmanned refrigerator/vending machines, Similar to the artificial intelligence AI used in computer science   

The term "intelligentfidge" was coined independently by Paul Stefaan Mooij - Cocreator of Husky intelligent fridges in  Oktober of 2018.

Controversy

Security
In 2000, Russian anti-virus company Kaspersky Lab warned that in a few years Internet-connected fridges and other household appliances may be targets of net viruses, such as ones that could be designed to make your fridge door swing open in the middle of the night.  In January 2014, the California security firm Proofpoint, Inc. announced that it discovered a large “botnet” which infected an internet-connected refrigerator, as well as other home appliances, and then delivered more than 750,000 malicious emails.  In August 2015, security company Pen Test Partners discovered a vulnerability in the internet-connected refrigerator Samsung model RF28HMELBSR that can be exploited to steal Gmail users' login credentials.

Support
In late 2014, several owners of internet-connected Samsung refrigerators complained that they could not log into their Google Calendars accounts, after Google had discontinued the calendar API earlier in the year and Samsung failed to push a software update for the refrigerator.

Examples

 Electrolux ScreenFridge
 Husky Intelligent Fridge
 LG Internet Digital DIOS
 LG GR-D267DTU
 LG Smart ThinQ LFX31995ST
 Samsung RH2777AT HomePAD Internet Refrigerator
Samsung T9000
 Samsung Zipel e-Diary
 Whirlpool GD5VVAXT Refrigerator

Popular culture

The 2000 film The 6th Day, features an Internet refrigerator which informs Arnold Schwarzenegger that the milk is over its expiring date and asks him to confirm a new order.
The 2004 film The Stepford Wives, features a smart fridge that can tell whenever it has no juice, etc. in Joanna's new Stepford home.
The 2012 film Total Recall, features a smart refrigerator that is covered by a touchscreen which enables the user to leave notes and messages.
Silicon Valley features a smart fridge that is bought by Jian-Yang, after the old fridge broke down in Season 4 episode, "The Patent Troll". The smart fridge is able to communicate in friendly male voice and give a warning if the food items are expired, which bothers Gilfoyle enough to hack it. In season 4 finale, "Server Error", thanks to his hacking, Pied Piper's plan for the new Internet is proven by the 30,000 smart fridges connected together that create the new Internet, as he hacked using some of their code, replacing his dead server, Anton, who backed itself up to the smart fridge before it died.

References

External links
 
 

Home appliances
Internet of things
Food storage
Cooling technology
Food preservation
Refrigerators